Sheahan is a surname. Notable people with the surname include:

 Bill Sheahan (umpire) (born 1953), Australian Test cricket match umpire
 Bill Sheahan (politician) (1895–1975), Australian politician
 Frank D. Sheahan (1901-1974), American politician
 Frankie Sheahan (born 1976), rugby player
 John Sheahan (born 1939), Irish violinist and folk musician
 Maurie Sheahan (1905–1956), Australian rules footballer
 Mike Sheahan (born 1945), Australian journalist
 Paul Sheahan (born 1946), Australian Test cricketer
 Riley Sheahan (born 1991), Canadian ice hockey player
 Robert Sheehan (born 1988), Irish actor
 Terry Sheahan (born 1947), Australian judge and former politician
 Tom Sheahan (born 1968), Irish Fine Gael politician

See also
 Sheehan (disambiguation)
 Sheahon Zenger (b.1966) is an American university sports administrator